The C&C 33 is a series of Canadian sailboats, that were designed by Robert W. Ball of C&C Design and first built in 1974.

The C&C 33 Mark I is a development of the C&C 3/4 Ton, which was introduced earlier in 1974.

Production
The boat designs were built by C&C Yachts in Canada, but are now out of production.

Design
The C&C 33 series are small recreational keelboats, built predominantly of fibreglass, with wood trim. They have masthead sloop rigs with internally-mounted spade-type rudders.

Variants

C&C 33-1 or Mark I
This model was introduced in 1974 and was produced until 1977, with 209 produced.
C&C 30E
Built from 1977 until 1982 in Europe, this boat was based upon the Mark I design.
C&C 33-2 or Mark II
Smaller and lighter than the Mark I, this entirely new design was introduced in 1984 and was built until 1988, with 200 completed. The centreboard version  has a PHRF racing average handicap of 150 with a high of 158 and low of 141.

See also
List of sailing boat types

Related development
C&C 3/4 Ton

Similar sailboats
Abbott 33
Alajuela 33
Arco 33
C&C 101
C&C SR 33
Cape Dory 33
Cape Dory 330
CS 33
Endeavour 33
Hans Christian 33
Hunter 33
Hunter 33-2004
Hunter 33.5
Hunter 333
Hunter 336
Hunter 340
Marlow-Hunter 33
Mirage 33
Moorings 335
Nonsuch 33
Tanzer 10
Viking 33
Watkins 33

References

External links

Keelboats
1970s sailboat type designs
Sailing yachts
Sailboat type designs by Robert W. Ball
Sailboat types built by C&C Yachts